Nagyszénás is a large village in Békés County, in the Southern Great Plain region of south-east Hungary.

Main sights
 "Park" Bath of Nagyszénás
 Kiss György Observatory
 the Evangelist Church
 the Our Lady Catholic Church

Geography
It covers an area of 95.56 km² and has a population of 5063 people (2013). The nearest town is Orosháza.

References

External links

  in Hungarian

Populated places in Békés County